Bautista Delguy (born 22 April 1997) is an Argentine rugby union player who plays for the Argentina national team and ASM Clermont Auvergne in the French Top 14. His playing position is Wing.

Delguy's first professional debut came against the Lions at Ellis Park Stadium whilst playing for the Jaguares in the Super Rugby, February 2018.

Delguy was a starter for the  national team on 14 November 2020 in their first ever win against the All Blacks.

Career

Bordeaux
In late 2020, Delguy signed for Top 14 side, Bordeaux after the abandonment of the Super Rugby competition following the COVID-19 pandemic.

Perpignan
Delguy now plays for ASM Clermont Auvergne in France’s Top 14 competition.

References

External links
 

Jaguares (Super Rugby) players
Rugby union wings
Argentine rugby union players
1997 births
Living people
Club Pucará players
Argentina international rugby union players
Rugby sevens players at the 2014 Summer Youth Olympics
Sportspeople from Buenos Aires Province